Ayatollah Abolghasem Khazali Boroujerdi (21 March 1925 – 16 September 2015) was a hardline Iranian politician, fundamentalist Shi'i cleric and a founding member of Haghani school with close ties with Mahmoud Ahmadinejad and Saeed Jalili. He was the conservative chairman of the Guardian Council, and was the oldest member of the current Assembly of Experts. Before the Islamic Revolution, he was one of the strongest challengers of the Shah, and was taken to jail several times. He died on 16 September 2015.

References

1925 births
2015 deaths
Members of the Assembly of Experts
Members of the Guardian Council
People from Tehran
Society of Seminary Teachers of Qom members
Members of the Assembly of Experts for Constitution